Martin 'Marty' Reisman (February 1, 1930 – December 7, 2012) was an American champion table tennis player and author. He was the 1958 and 1960 U.S. Men's singles champion and the 1997 U.S. hardbat champion.

Table tennis career
Reisman started playing table tennis at the age of 12 in Manhattan's Lower East Side, and then as a hustler in New York in the 1940s, playing for bets and prizes, notably at Lawrence's Broadway Table Tennis Club at 54th Street and Broadway. Comedian Jonathan Katz recalled that he met and played against Reisman when he was a youth and that Reisman was an amazing athlete, and that he was once beaten by him with the flat end of a chess piece.

He won five bronze medals at the World Table Tennis Championships, starting with a men's team event bronze at 1948 World Table Tennis Championships, followed by three medals at the 1949 World Table Tennis Championships in the men's singles, the men's team and the mixed doubles with Peggy McLean. His fifth medal came in 1952 in the men's doubles with Douglas Cartland at the 1952 World Table Tennis Championships.

He and Cartland performed a comedy table tennis routine as the opening act for the Harlem Globetrotters. Reisman won 22 major table tennis titles from 1946 to 2002, including two United States Opens and a British Open.

In later life, Reisman continued to be one of the most visible presences and known personalities in the table tennis world. He became the oldest player to win an open national competition in a racket sport by winning the 1997 United States National Hardbat Championship at the age of 67, and was the president of Table Tennis Nation at the time of his death in December 2012. Reisman was Jewish.

Bibliography
Reisman's  autobiography, The Money Player, The Confessions of America's Greatest Table Tennis Player and Hustler was published in 1974.  Publisher: Morrow,

See also
 List of select Jewish table tennis players
 List of table tennis players
 List of World Table Tennis Championships medalists

References

External links
 Table Tennis Nation
 Full biography at USA Table Tennis Hall of Fame. Accessed November 2006.
 Interview With Marty Reisman at USA Table Tennis By Tyra Parkins 2001. Accessed November 2006.
 Marty Reisman article at hardbat.com
 A Giant Misunderstanding Nearly Made A Giant-killer Of The Author, by Parton Keese
 A Little Night Music by Ray Kennedy
 Obituary in The New York Times

1930 births
2012 deaths
Jewish American sportspeople
Jewish table tennis players
American male table tennis players
World Table Tennis Championships medalists
21st-century American Jews